"Maybe Someday" is the debut single by the Ordinary Boys, from their first album Over the Counter Culture. It was released on the B-Unique label as a 2 track CD single, with the B-side "Laughing from the Sidelines". The single sold well enough to chart in the top 40, but was not allowed due to a free sticker being seen by chart rules as a free gift.

References

2004 songs
2004 debut singles
The Ordinary Boys songs
B-Unique Records singles
Songs written by Preston (singer)